Anandpur Sahib railway station is a small railway station in Rupnagar district, Punjab. Its code is ANSB. It serves Anandpur Sahib city. The station consists of 1 platform. The platform is not well sheltered. It lacks many facilities including water and sanitation.

Major trains 
Some of the important trains that run from Anandpur Sahib are:

 Himachal Express
 Amritsar–Nangal Dam Express
 Una Jan Shatabdi Express
 Haridwar Una Link Janshatabdi Express (via Chandigarh)
 Hazur Sahib Nanded-Una Himachal Express
 Gurumukhi Superfast Express
 Vande Bharat Express

References

Railway stations in Rupnagar district
Ambala railway division